330,003 Crossdressers From Beyond the Rig Veda is the tenth studio album by American experimental rock band Sun City Girls, released in 1996 by Abduction Records.

Track listing

Personnel
Adapted from the 330,003 Crossdressers From Beyond the Rig Veda liner notes.

Sun City Girls
 Alan Bishop – bass guitar, 6-string bass guitar, electric guitar, banjo, mandolin, gamelan, balalaika, flute, cello, melodica, bells, harmonica, tape, effects, percussion
 Richard Bishop – electric guitar, lap steel guitar, acoustic guitar, mandolin, banjo, piano, organ, flute, horns, gong, gamelan, percussion
 Charles Gocher – drums, bongos, shakers, wood block, percussion, autoharp, bells, gong, gamelan, effects, vocals

Production and additional personnel
 Scott Colburn – recording, mixing, editing, gamelan (1.6, 1.14, 2.3, 2.4), percussion (1.1, 1.16), piano (1.7, 1.10), ukulele (1.1), DX7 synthesizer (1.12), vocals (1.13), effects (2.5)
 Eyvind Kang – violin (2.4), musical arrangements (2.4)
 Wade Olson – recording (1.3)
 Sun City Girls – recording, cover art

Release history

References

External links 
 

1996 albums
Sun City Girls albums
Locust Music albums